Ichnanthus, commonly called bedgrass, is a genus of tropical plants in the grass family, widespread in Africa, Asia, Australia, and the Americas.

 Species

 formerly included
see Chevalierella Echinolaena Homolepis Ottochloa Panicum Parodiophyllochloa Yakirra

References

Panicoideae
Grasses of Africa
Grasses of Asia
Grasses of Europe
Grasses of North America
Grasses of Oceania
Grasses of South America
Poaceae genera
Taxa named by Palisot de Beauvois